Giuseppe Chicchi (born 10 February 1944) is an Italian politician who served as Mayor of Rimini for three terms (1992–1993, 1993–1995, 1995–1999) and Deputy for the Legislature XV (2006–2008).

References

1944 births
Mayors of Rimini
Deputies of Legislature XV of Italy
Living people